The River Tiddy is a small river in south-east Cornwall, the main tributary of the River Lynher. The Tiddy rises near Pensilva and flows south east past the village of Tideford until it joins the Lynher just after passing St Germans. The name of Tideford derives from its location on the river, literally meaning "Ford on the River Tiddy".

St Germans is a historic fishing village situated on the Tiddy just upstream of its confluence with the Lynher. The Quay Sailing Club are based at St Germans Quay. The Tiddy and Lynher rivers are alternatively called St Germans River downstream of St Germans.

References

Tiddy, River
Cornish Killas
2Tiddy